Mecocerus wallacei is a species of beetle belonging to the family Anthribidae.

Description 
Mecocerus wallacei exhibits a strong sexual dimorphism, as the males are much larger than females and the thread-like antennae are much longer than the body.

Distribution 
This species can be found in Borneo.

References 

 Encyclopedia of Life
 Global species
 Catalogue of Life
 Universal Biological Indexer

Anthribidae
Beetles described in 1860
Taxa named by Francis Polkinghorne Pascoe